Begich may refer to:

People
 Begich, commander of the Tatars in the Battle of the Vozha River in 1378
 Begich family of Alaska and Minnesota, United States, including:
 Joseph Begich (1930–2019), Minnesota House of Representatives (1975–1993)
 Nick Begich (1932–1972), United States Representative from Alaska (1971–1972)
 Nick Begich, Jr. (born 1958), writer, conspiracy theorist and infrequent political participant
 Nick Begich III (born 1977), Republican candidate for 2022 United States House of Representatives election in Alaska
 Mark Begich (born 1962), former United States Senator from Alaska (2009–2015)
 Tom Begich (born 1960), member of the Alaska Senate

Other
 Begich Middle School, Anchorage, Alaska
 Begich Towers, Whittier, Alaska
 The Begich, Boggs Visitor Center at Portage Glacier, near Whittier

See also
 Begić, a surname